Jenő Szalay (4 September 1904 – 13 August 1976) was a Hungarian sprinter. He competed in the men's 400 metres at the 1928 Summer Olympics.

References

1904 births
1976 deaths
Athletes (track and field) at the 1928 Summer Olympics
Hungarian male sprinters
Olympic athletes of Hungary
Place of birth missing